Songs of Love by Charley Pride is the fifteenth studio album by the American country music artist of the same name. It was released in 1973 on the RCA Victor label (catalog no. LSP-4837).

The album debuted on Billboard magazine's country album chart on January 27, 1973, spent four weeks at the No. 1 spot, and remained on the chart for a total of 32 weeks. The album also included the No. 1 hit single "She's Too Good to Be True".

It was awarded three stars from the web site AllMusic.

Track listing

See also
 Charley Pride discography

References

1973 albums
Charley Pride albums
RCA Records albums